The Lyd is a river rising at Lyd Head (Corn Ridge in NW Dartmoor) in the Dartmoor national park in Devon in South West England and flowing into the River Tamar beyond Lifton. It runs through Lydford Gorge, the deepest gorge in South West England.

Lydford Gorge
Lydford Gorge (National Trust) is a dramatic feature of the river at Lydford on the edge of the Dartmoor National Park; it is a  gorge near Lydford on the River Lyd, which is the deepest in South West England. It was formed by the process of river capture, where the start of a nearby river eroded backwards until its origin met the Lyd, diverting its course into the second channel.

External links
Lydford Gorge information at the National Trust

References

Rivers of Devon
Dartmoor
Canyons and gorges of England
National Trust properties in Devon
Sites of Special Scientific Interest in Devon
Tourist attractions in Devon
Geology of Devon
Nature reserves in Devon
1Lyd